The 1984 Asia Cup (also known as the Rothmans Asia Cup) was the first edition of the Asia Cup. It was held in Sharjah, UAE, which was the location of the newly formed Asian Cricket Council. The new tournament was held between April 6–13, in 1984 and three teams took part: India, Pakistan and Sri Lanka. The Sharjah Cricket Association Stadium hosted its first One Day International (ODI) match.

The 1984 Asia Cup was a round-robin tournament where each team played the other once. India won both its matches, winning the inaugural Cup. Sri Lanka came in second while Pakistan lost both its matches.

Squads

Matches

Group stage

Statistics

Most runs

Most wickets

References

External links
 Cricinfo tournament page
 Cricket Archive: Rothmans Asia Cup 1983/84
 CricInfo: Asia Cup (Ind Pak SL) in Sharjah: Apr 1984

Asia Cup
International cricket competitions from 1980–81 to 1985
Asia Cup, 1984
1984 in Emirati sport
International cricket competitions in the United Arab Emirates